Francisco de Busso (died 1576) was an Italian courtier in the service of Mary, Queen of Scots. Busso was a Master of Household, in charge of provisions and household servants.

Career
Busso had been a servant and Master of Household to Mary of Guise (died 1560). He was a Knight of the Order of St James of the Sword. Mary made him superintendent and overseer of her palaces and building works in September 1563. He was the Keeper of Holyrood Palace. His name appears in financial records of the court as "Senyeour Frances" or "Francisco". His first name is recorded as "John" in some official documents. He worked with William MacDowall to improve the gardens at Holyrood.

A French diplomat, Paul de Foix, noted he was close to Mary. In July 1565, Mary gave him a damask silk mantle from her mother's clothing and gave the rest of the outfit to the wife of the wardrobe servant Servais de Condé.

Busso had a prominent role at the Baptism of Prince James at Stirling Castle in December 1566. There was a procession bringing the food into the Great Hall, which Busso joined as a Master of Household walking with Gilbert Balfour and the Laird of Findlater.

Suspicion of foreign courtiers
John Knox wrote of the disapproval of Scottish courtiers at the influence of Busso and other foreigners preferred by Mary. In September 1565 the English diplomat Thomas Randolph listed him with David Riccio, and the Englishman Thomas Fowler, as "unworthy persons" and foreigners who were exciting suspicion for their influence at court. In 1565 the leaders of the Chaseabout Raid, a rebellion against Mary, included his presence in their list of grievances.

Knox also wrote that Busso, and three other men of the "queen's domestics and strangers", were involved by the Earl of Bothwell in the murder of Lord Darnley.

Death
He died at Dunkeld in April 1576.

References

1576 deaths
Court of Mary, Queen of Scots
Masters of the Scottish royal household
Italian expatriates in Scotland